On 7 July 2012, the National Transitional Council, in power since the Libyan Civil War, supervised democratic elections for a 200-member General National Congress to replace the Council. The assembly was to choose a prime minister and organize parliamentary elections in 2013.  A process to write a constitution was also to be determined. Unrest driven by armed militias, ethnic minority and radical groups undermined the process and the government for the years following the overthrowing of Muammar Gaddafi. While internal apathy towards democratic reforms slowed the process, external bodies such as the European Union were still pressing for the establishment of a national dialogue to build consensus for the drafting of a new constitution to take place before the end of 2014. Parliamentary elections were scheduled to be held on 25 June 2014 in a move aimed at stabilizing the country and quelling the unrest.

Electoral bodies
According to Article 157 of the 2017 draft Libyan constitution, the Libyan High National Election Commission (HNEC) is responsible for organising elections of national political bodies in Libya.

The Central Commission of Municipal Council Elections (CCMCE) was created in 2018 for organising municipal elections in 2018 to replace councils elected in 2014. It started holding these elections in 2019 in March and April.

2012 elections

2014 elections

Constituent Assembly
HNEC organised the 2014 Libyan Constitutional Assembly election of 60 representatives in February 2014.

House of Representatives

The Libyan election commission on 20 May 2014 announced elections would be held on 25 June 2014.

Historical elections

Libya under Gaddafi
National elections were indirect through a hierarchy of people's committees. The head of government was elected by the General People's Congress. The last such election was held in March 2010.

Libya's parliament consisted of a unicameral General People's Congress. Its members were elected indirectly through a hierarchy of people's committees.

Suffrage was 18 years of age; universal and technically compulsory.

Kingdom of Libya
1952 Libyan general election
1956 Libyan general election
1960 Libyan general election
1964 Libyan general election
1965 Libyan general election

References

CIA - The World Factbook: Libya